is a passenger railway station located in the city of  Akō,, Hyōgo Prefecture, Japan, operated by the West Japan Railway Company (JR West).

Lines

Station layout
The station consists of one ground-level side platform serving a single-directional track. The station is staffed.

Adjacent stations

|-
!colspan=5|JR West

History
Nishi-Aioi Station was opened on December 12, 1951. With the privatization of the Japan National Railways (JNR) on April 1, 1987, the station came under the aegis of the West Japan Railway Company.

Passenger statistics
In fiscal 2019, the station was used by an average of 740 passengers daily

Surrounding area
Hyogo Prefectural Aioi Industrial High School
Aioi Bay
IHI Aioi Factory
Japan National Route 250

See also
List of railway stations in Japan

References

External links

 JR West Station Official Site

Railway stations in Hyōgo Prefecture
Railway stations in Japan opened in 1951
Akō, Hyōgo